The IEEE Conference on Computer Communications (INFOCOM) addresses key topics and issues related to computer communications, with emphasis on traffic management and protocols for both wired and wireless networks.

The first INFOCOM conference took place in the United States in Las Vegas, Nevada, in 1982. Since then it was held in many locations around the world, including China, Japan, Israel, Italy, Spain, Brazil, as well as many other regions of the United States.

References

External links
 IEEE INFOCOM

Computer conferences